The John Glenn Story is a 1962 American short documentary film directed by Michael R. Lawrence about the astronaut John Glenn. It was nominated for an Academy Award for Best Documentary Short.

References

External links
 , posted by NASA
 
 

1962 films
1962 short films
1962 documentary films
American short documentary films
Documentary films about the space program of the United States
Films about astronauts
1960s short documentary films
John Glenn
1960s English-language films
1960s American films